The Didier Pti'tAvion is a French ultralight aircraft that was designed and produced by Didier ULM of Francheval. The aircraft is supplied as a kit for amateur construction or as a complete ready-to-fly-aircraft.

Design and development
The aircraft was designed to comply with the Fédération Aéronautique Internationale microlight rules. It features a strut-braced high-wing a two-seats-in-side-by-side configuration enclosed cockpit, fixed tricycle landing gear and a single engine in tractor configuration.

The aircraft is made predominantly from welded steel tubing, with its flying surfaces covered in doped aircraft fabric. The standard engine is the  Rotax 912UL four-stroke powerplant.

The aircraft comes with its own open-frame trailer for ground transport.

Specifications (Pti'tAvion)

References

External links

2000s French ultralight aircraft
Homebuilt aircraft
Single-engined tractor aircraft